Allied Press is an independent New Zealand media and publishing company based in Dunedin. The company's main asset is the Otago Daily Times, New Zealand's oldest daily newspaper. Allied Press has a number of other daily and community newspapers and  commercial printing operations throughout the South Island including the Canterbury–based media company Star Media. It also operates Dunedin's regional television station, Channel 39, on Freeview HD.

History

Allied Press was formed through the merger of two Dunedin newspaper companies, the Otago Daily Times (ODT) and the former Evening Star, on 13 May 1975. The merger process was completed during the rest of the year following shareholder approval and other required agreements. ODT staff subsequently shifted into the Evening Star building. The Evening Star subsequently ceased operations on 3 November 1979 and was replaced by a weekly newspaper called The Star. Hal Masters became the company's first chairman while the ODT manager Frank Dickson and Vic Cavanagh served as joint managing directors.

In 1979, the Christchurch–based H.W. Smith and the tourism company Mount Cook Group attempted separate takeover bids of Allied Press by buying up shares. In response, the businessman Sir Julian Smith merged Allied Press with his company John M. Fraser and Co Ltd to form a new privately listed company called Otago Press and Produce Limited (OPP). OPP was active in egg and poultry distribution, fruit and producer markets, building supplies, and real estate. The new company was led by chairman T.C. (Tom) Fraser and Deputy Chair Julian Smith, the former managing director of John M. Fraser and Co. In 1986, Smith purchased Otago Press and Produce, reestablishing Allied Press Ltd as a private business. Smith became Allied Press' principal shareholder, chairman and managing director while his brother Nick became a substantial shareholder, director and business manager.

On 12 June 2016, Julian Smith stepped down as managing director of Allied Press. Grant McKenzie, the Dunedin City Council's financial officer and the former director of the University of Otago's financial services, was appointed as the company's chief executive officer. While Smith remains the chairman of the company, McKenzie took over the running of Allied Press.

Besides the Otago Daily Times, Allied Press owns a majority stake in the Greymouth Star. The company also owns a range of community and farming newspapers through the South Island including North Canterbury News, the Ashburton Courier, The Timaru Courier, Oamaru Mail, Lakes District and Central Otago News, Mountain Scene, The Star and The Ensign. In 2018, Allied Press acquired the Clutha Leader from Stuff.

In August 2018, Allied Press acquired the Canterbury media company Star Media, which owned a stable of community newspapers, magazines, and events including the Christchurch–based The Star. Star Media's chairman Nick Smith also served as Allied Press' director and had previously worked for The Star as their advertising cadet. Star Media subsequently became a subsidiary of Allied Press. 

During the outbreak of the COVID-19 pandemic in New Zealand, Allied Press maintained the print circulation of the Otago Daily Times as well as its websites but suspended the circulation of its community and farming newspapers on 25 March 2020 to comply with lockdown restrictions. In April 2020, Allied Press launched a major project to upgrade its Dunedin printing press. By 14 May 2020, the Government had eased lockdown restrictions, allowing Allied Press' community newspapers and magazines to resume operations.

Following the Delta variant community outbreak in August 2021, Allied Press continued publishing the Otago Daily Times and most of its community papers. However, it suspended publication of the Southland Express (Invercargill), the Cromwell Bulletin, The Star (Christchurch), and Christchurch community papers due to lockdown restrictions.

Organisation and assets

Management
Allied Press is owned by Sir Julian Smith, who serves as its chairman and managing director, and his family. Other key members of the company's leadership team include director and business manager Nick Smith and operations director Ray Clarkson. The company has more than 400 employees.

Headquarters and bureaus
Allied Press has its headquarters in an imposing building in Lower Stuart Street, Dunedin. The building was formerly the home of Dunedin's The Evening Star prior to its amalgamation with the Otago Daily Times in 1979. The building houses the Otago Daily Times and Channel 39.

The building was designed by Edmund Anscombe and built in the late 1920s and is part of a historic precinct that also includes the Dunedin Law Courts and Dunedin Railway Station. It is listed as a Category II Historic Place.

Allied Press also operates several regional offices throughout the South Island including Alexandra, Amberley, Ashburton, Balclutha, Gore, Invercargill, Oamaru, Queenstown, Rangiora, Timaru, and Wanaka.

Brands and publications
Allied Press's flagship publication is the daily newspaper Otago Daily Times. It also owns a majority stake in the Greymouth Star along with a range of South Island community and farming newspapers. In addition, Allied Press operates separate printing and television divisions including commercial, newsprint services, local television station Channel 39, and the Christchurch-based media company Star Media.

Newspapers
Otago Daily Times
Ashburton Courier
Central Rural Life
 The Ensign (Gore)
Greymouth Star
Hokitika Guardian
Lakes District and Central Otago News (Alexandra)
Mountain Scene
North Canterbury News
Oamaru Mail
Southern Rural Life
Southland Express (Invercargill)
 The Star (Dunedin)
The Timaru Courier (Timaru)
The West Coast Messenger

Special publications
Dunedin Cruise Guide
Huanying South

Star Media

The Canterbury media company Star Media is also a division of Allied Press. Star Media's assets including the Christchurch community newspaper The Star, the South Island lifestyle magazine Style, and national magazines Kiwi Gardener, Kiwi Gardener Quarterly and Rugby News. Star Media also runs several Christchurch events including the City 2 Surf and the Home and Leisure Show.

References

Bibliography

External links
Allied Press website

 
Newspaper companies of New Zealand
Heritage New Zealand Category 2 historic places in Otago
Mass media in Dunedin
Edmund Anscombe buildings
1920s architecture in New Zealand
Central Dunedin
New Zealand companies established in 1975